Prism Ridge is a small ridge with bare rock outcroppings located just north of Haskell Glacier and two nautical miles (3.7 km) south-southwest of Bonnabeau Dome, in the Jones Mountains of Antarctica. Mapped and named by the University of Minnesota-Jones Mountains Party, 1960–61. They found a large block of ice in the shape of a square prism standing as an isolated feature at the south end of this ridge.

Ridges of Ellsworth Land